Mario Arnaldo Gómez Castellanos (born August 12, 1981 in Tela, Honduras) is a Honduran footballer.

Club career
Gómez played for New Jersey Stallions, Vida and Victoria, before joining F.C. Motagua in summer 2009.

He most recently played for Vida in the Honduran football league. He won a sub-championship with F.C. Motagua but could not stay more than a year due to inconsistency and lack of appearances.

International career
Gómez made his debut for Honduras in a March 2005 friendly match against the United States, coming on as a second-half substitute for Carlos Morán. His second and final international match was a February 2006 friendly against China.

References

External links

1981 births
Living people
People from Tela
Association football midfielders
Honduran footballers
Honduras international footballers
New Jersey Stallions players
C.D.S. Vida players
C.D. Victoria players
F.C. Motagua players
Liga Nacional de Fútbol Profesional de Honduras players
Honduran expatriate footballers
Expatriate soccer players in the United States
New York Red Bulls draft picks